The Koskull family, also written as Koschkull, is a wealthy aristocratic family of Livonian origins, famous for their extensive lands and manors. The family are descendants of the first King of Livonia and officially established as Koskele in 1302 in Livonia. The family spread to Estonia, Courland and Poland throughout the 15th century, Sweden and Finland in the 17th century, and Prussia and Russia in the 18th century. Several branches of the family still exist today, and is believed to be related to the von der Pahlen family.

The family was enrolled in the Livonian Knighthood in 1742, in the Estonian Knighthood in 1777 and in the Courland Knighthood in 1841. In 1834, the family was granted a baron rank in Prussia. The highest count title (Imperial Count) of the Holy Roman Empire was awarded to the family in 1805, and in 1898 the family became counts in Imperial Russia. In Sweden the family were granted noble status in 1638, two branches were then uplifted to a baron status in 1719 and 1720. The imperial county title was later on transferred by decree to a Swedish branch of the family. Currently, the Swedish branch owns 20,000 hectares across the United Kingdom and an estate of 6,000 hectares in Sweden, called Engaholm. The family's combined net worth is estimated to be $1.6 billion.

History

Origins 
The first written information on the family dates back to 1302, when Andreas de Koskele was mentioned as a vassal in the Archbishopric of Riga. It is believed that he was the grandson of Gerhard de Koskele, the illegitimate son of Emperor Frederick II. It is most probable that Gerhard was part of the Livonian Crusades, which would explain his marriage to Magdalena, the daughter of Caupo of Turaida.

In addition, the Koskull family claim descent from Caupo of Turaida, who was considered the first King of Livonia and who helped Bishop Meinhard spread Christianity in the region. Caupo himself converted to Christianity in 1186, and travelled to Rome to meet with Pope Innocent III in 1203. The Pope had granted and confirmed the title Caupo of Livonia and a coat of arms depicting three golden lilies in a purple background. The Koskull family and the Lieven family bear similar coat of arms: three lilies positioned identically. Furthermore, the two families have traced their origins to Caupo of Turaida.

Relation to the Von Der Pahlen family 
According to a legend, the family owned both sides of Lake Burtnieks in the 13th century, but due to a dispute between two brothers, it was decided that one brother would keep the Burtnieki side, while the other would keep the other side. The brother with the Burtnieki side had an oak beam with iron tires rammed into the lake to indicate the border, and also adopted a different name: von der Pahlen. He then changed the Koskull's coat of arms background color to yellow while retaining the lake leaves, and hung it on the oak beam. Thereafter the von der Pahlen family was born.

Baltic branches 
The Koskulls are among the oldest Livonian families and were among the most influential and respected families in Terra Mariana. The first written information on the family appeared as the vassal of the Archbishop of Riga, as Andreas de Koskele in 1302. Throughout the 14th century, the family acquired vast lands and large manors. In the 14th century the family owned land properties in the Dikli-Augstroze parish region of Līvu galā, now known as the Dikļi and Umurga parishes. Several family members participated in the wars of the Livonian Confederation in the 16th century, such as Klaus Koskull, who can be found in the 1423 Treaty of Melno (Vertag von Melno-See) with the Grand Duchy of Lithuania. The family was enrolled into the Livonian Knighthood under Nr 33, Estonian Knighthood under Nr 29 and into the Curonian Knighthood under Nr 138, all with a Baron title. The family was also enrolled with a Count title into the Livonian Knighthood under Nr 328, and into the Curonian Knighthood under Nr 260.

They are one of few families who immigrated from Germany to Livonia during the Livonian Crusades in the 13th century. First mentioned in 1302, the family settled in the northern part of the archdiocese of Riga, present day Dickeln parish, and acquired many estates during the colonization period. Their primary ancestral estates consisted of Lappier, Koskullshof (Stumpen), Schujen, Pahlen and Seckendorf. It is certain that the family has a common origin with the von der Pahlen family, who carry the same coat of arms, three sea leaves, and who appeared in the region at about the same time. The family also owned the estates Napküll, Sutzen, Kulsdorf, Mazauce, Ostrominski (Košķele) as well as the village of Lemskull. Peter von Koskull acquired the Asuppen and Adsirn estates in 1719. During the 14th century, the family branched out to nearby dioceses (1385-04-25—Mauritius, Berend and Godeke Koskull are mentioned in the diocese of Dorpat. 1360-05-09—Andreas Koskull in Osel). In the archdiocese the family held important positions, such as Brand Koskull (bailiff at Turaida Castle from 1417 to 1420), Jakob Koskull (bailiff at the Koknese Castle in 1469) and held significant estates, mainly in Ubbenorm and the surrounding parishes. From Livonia, the family branched out to Courland and Estonia. Reinhold Koskull, who moved to Courland in 1603 from Dorpat, started a branch there. His descendants acquired significant estates in the areas of Grobin, Windau and Talsen. The branch still exists today.

Swedish branches 
The Koskull family in Sweden first appeared in the 1450s, when Brand Koskull the Elder migrated from Livonia. From then on members of the family held high positions in armies, courts and within the royal palace. The family is widely known in Sweden for its royal mistresses of several kings, notably Aurora Wilhelmina Koskull and Mariana Koskull. The relationship between the royal family and the Koskulls was viewed as very close, which rendered the family very influential within the aristocracy. At some stage the family had close relations with Napoleon I; however, it is unclear if it was only with Mariana and Aurora Koskull or if it extended to other family members. They are also one of the founders of Kosta Boda, a famous Swedish glassworks which was founded in 1742 by General Anders Koskull and Georg Bogislaus Staël von Holstein. The family had 3 branches, nr 248, 160 and 184 which all held noble or baron titles, with branch Nr 184 the sole surviving branch today. 

Several towns are named after the family; Koskullskulle, Kosta.

The first branch, Nr 248, was presented in 1638 by Anders Koskull the young (great-great-grandson of Brand Koskull the Elder), who served as a lieutenant and colonel of various regiments. In 1642 he became the Governor of Tartu County and in 1656 Governor of Viborg County. He was neutralized in 1638 as a nobleman by Queen Christina and died in 1676 as a Major General. His wife was Maria Catharina Frankelin whose mother was Constantina Eriksdotter, the daughter of King Erik XIV and Agda Persdotter. Their daughters married Boije af Gennäs, von Stackelberg and von Weissensée. Their eldest son, Anders, was a major in the Ostgöta infantry and married to a Klingspor.  The family branch contained many notable individuals, however in 1748 the branch's last family member died. The second branch, Nr 160, was part of Nr 248 until Major General Anders Koskull (son of Erik Koskull) was elevated to a baron rank in 1719. He was married three times and had 9 children, however all of his sons died without an heir. He was the lord of Engaholm, which he passed on to his son-in-law, a Koskull from the branch Nr 184. Anders Koskull himself closed the branch in 1742. The third branch, Nr 184, was also elevated in 1720 from branch 248. Otto Johan Koskull was known to be the right hand of King Carl XII, fighting in numerous Swedish and Polish wars, hence the branch was born. His wife was Märta Bonde, daughter of von de Noth. One of their sons, Ulric Carl, went into Russian service as did his sons after him. The branch survived thanks to the youngest son of Otto Johan, the equestrian master Anders Gustaf who married a relative from the Koskull branch Nr 160. The family was then divided into two smaller branches. The main branch comes from Anders Gustaf's son, a court lieutenant Otto Anders Koskull. He had several children with Amalia Beata Silfversparre. The younger branch comes from war councilor Gustaf Fredrik Koskull, who married Anna Charlotta Gjelstrup in Hamburg. Their son Anders Erik Koskull, a court marshal, married Johanna Fredrica Sophia Fleming af Liebelitz. The current (2004) head of the family is Johan Koskull (born 1938) who owns and resides in the family estate Engaholm in Småland.

Russian branch 

In Imperial Russia the family was enrolled in the “General Armorial of the Noble Families of the Russian Empire” in the 17th part. First announced by the Minister of Justice on 20 January 1805 to the ruling senate by imperial decree, Joseph Koskull was granted the highest count title (Imperial Count) of the Holy Roman Empire by the Emperor Franz II. In May 1897 the State council allowed the great-grandson of Imperial Count Joseph Koskull, court counselor Nikolai-Karl-Irnest Gospfor von Koskull to transfer his county title to a relative of his, Friedrich-Ernest-Alexander Karlov von Koskull in the name of the Tsar. The new title was later approved by a certain ruling senate on 5 November 1898. On 12 November that year the same ruling senate granted the oldest son of Count-Friedrich-Ernest-Alexander von Koskull, Adam-Karl-Edward-Wilhelm-Alexander von Koskull, to use the title of count following the death of his father. The diploma for the Counts dignity was signed on 2 January 1902. A member of the Russian branch, Count Mikhail Frantsovich Koskull (1825-1869), married Princess Varvara Petrovna Shcherbatova. Together they had one daughter, Countess Sofia Mikhailovna Koskull, who was married to Count Nikolay Feliksovich Sumarokov-Elston, the suspected grandson of King Federick William IV of Prussia. Their son Mikhail Nikolaevich Sumarokov-Elston was considered as the best tennis player in the Russian Empire, and 6th in the world at the time. Along with Alexander Alenitsy, he was the first Russian tennis player to participate in the Summer Olympic Games, and regularly played with Emperor Nicholas II. Countess Sofia Koskull's nephew-in-law was Prince Felix Yusupov, the last of the Yusupov princes and the richest man in the Russian Empire, therefore the Koskull's had access to extreme wealth until the Russian Revolution. Only Mikhail Sumarokov-Elston survived by boarding  HMS Marlborough to Malta with his cousin Prince Felix Yusupov. Several settlements in Russia are named after the family; a village in the Bolsherechensky district of the Omsk region, a village in the Tarsky district of the Omsk region, a village in the Tyukalinsky district of the Omsk region, a village in the Krasnoarmeisk district of the Chelyabinsk region and a lake in the Chanovsky district of the Novosibirsk region.

Prussian branch 

Not much is known about the Prussian Branch except that lieutenant general Ernst von Koschkull (1775-1856) and his two nephews, lieutenant general Leonhard von Koschkull (1798-1872) and first lieutenant Alexander von Koschkull (1799-1839) were granted a Baron title on 11 March 1834. The family branch came from the Courland branch.

Coat of Arms

Notable individuals 

 Ernst von Koskull (1775–1856), Prussian lieutenant general
 Georg Adolf Koskull (1780-1829), governor of Norrbotten
 Peter Johann von Koskull (1786–1852), Russian lieutenant general
 Leonhard von Koschkull (1798–1872), Prussian lieutenant general
 Friedrich von Koskull (1830-1886), Russian mining engineer, geologist
 Anders Magnus Koskull (1831–1883), Member of Parliament
 Adam von Koskull (1800–1874), Courland state official
 Andreas von Koskull (1906–1992), German SS leader and war criminal
 Josepha von Koskull (1898–1996), German-Baltic writer and translator
 Casper Von Koskull (born 1960), Finnish-Swedish economist and business leader

References 

 Gabriel Anrep:  Svenska adelns Ättar-taflor. Volume 2, Stockholm 1861, p. 486–491. (Swedish)
 Gustaf Elgenstierna: Den introducerade svenska adelns ättartavlor,  Volume 4, Stockholm 1929. Online processing: Family and barons coat of arms, nobility naturalization (1638) and coat of arms, barons (1719) with coat of arms and barons (1720) with coat of arms as well as counts coat of arms (1803) on adelsvapen.com. (Swedish)
 Genealogisches Handbuch der baltischen Ritterschaften. Part 1, 1: Livonia. Görlitz 1929, p. 360–374. (German)
 Genealogisches Handbuch der baltischen Ritterschaften. Part 2, 1.2: Estonian. Görlitz 1930, p. 679–680. (German)
 Genealogisches Handbuch der kurländischen Ritterschaft.  Volume 1, Görlitz undated, 328–348. (German)
 Genealogisches Handbuch des Adels. C. A. Starke Verlag, Limburg/Lahn. (German)
 Adelslexikon. Volume VI, Volume 91 of the complete series, 1987, p. 437–439.
 Freiherrliche Häuser. A 7, Volume 44 of the complete series, 1969, p. 231–249; 14, Volume 88 of the complete series, 1986, p. 275–287.
 Gräfliche Häuser. A 4, Volume 28 of the complete series, 1962, p. 236–238; 6, Volume 47 of the complete series, 1970, p. 180–183; 12, Volume 94 of the complete series, 1988, p. 294–297.
 Gothaisches Genealogisches Taschenbuch. Justus Perthes. (German)
 Gräfliche Häuser. Volume 30, 1857, p. 416.
 ''Freiherrliche Häuser.'' Volume 86, 1936 (original and older history), 1940 (continued)
 Jahrbuch für Genealogie, Heraldik und Sphragistik. Mitau. (German)
 Eduard von Fircks: ''Das Hausbuch des Reinhold von Koskull und seiner Nachkommen.'' 1894, p. 144–155.
 George Adalbert von Mülverstedt: Noch etwas über die Koskull-Medem-Buchholtzsche Verwandtschaft und über die Begüterung dieser Familien in Preußen. 1902, p. 147–154.
 Gustav Sommerfeldt: Zur Richtigstellung einiger Angaben über die Genealogie v. Koskull-v. Volume X. 1905/06, p. 251–254.
 Ernst Heinrich Kneschke: Deutsche Grafen-Häuser der Gegenwart in heraldischer, historischer und genealogischer Beziehung. Volume 1, T.O. Weigel, Leipzig 1852, p. 472–474. (German)
 Ernst Heinrich Kneschke: Neues allgemeines deutsches Adels-Lexicon. Volume 5, Leipzig 1864, p. 243–244. (German)
 Leopold von Ledebur: Adelslexicon der Preußischen Monarchie. Volume 1, Berlin 1855, p. 466. (German)
 J. Siebmacher's grosses und allgemeines Wappenbuch, Nuremberg: Bauer & Raspe (German)
 Konrad Blažek: Volume VII, Section 2. Supplementary Volume: Preußische Grafen und Freiherren, 1886, p. 34.
 Maximilian Gritzner: Volume III, Section 11. First Part; Der Adel der Russischen Ostseeprovinzen: Die Ritterschaft, 1898, p. 63, 162, 337, 491 and 497.
 Otto Magnus von Stackelberg: Genealogisches Handbuch der estländischen Ritterschaft, Volume 1, Görlitz, 1931, p. 159, Digitalised (German)
 Коскуль// Энциклопедический словарь Брокгауза и Ефрона in 86 volumes (82 volumes and 4 additional). - SPb., 1890–1907. (Russian)
 Pyotr Vladimirovich Dolgorukov. Российская родословная книга. Volume 3, p. 161. (Russian)
 Общий гербовник дворянских родов Российской империи, Volume 17, p. 9, Digitalised (Russian)
 Josi von Koskull Wikipedia Page (German)

External links 

 Koskull in the Svenskt biografiskt lexikon (Swedish)
 Koskull in the Ritterhuset (Swedish)
 Ancestry book of Golenishchev-Kutuzov (Russian)
 Best tennis player of the Russian Empire.

Koskull family